Pio Piacentini (5 September 1846  – 4 April 1928) was an Italian architect, the father of Marcello Piacentini.  He is best known for his Palazzo delle Esposizioni in Rome.

Life
He was born in Rome and trained in the Academy of St. Luke.

Piacentini worked most in Rome. His works include the Palazzo delle Esposizioni (1883), the Rinascente palace (1920), the monumental entrance to Villa Sciarra, Palazzo Piacentini (finished after his death, in 1932) and others.  He also directed the construction works of the Vittoriano since 1905, together with Manfredo Manfredi and Gaetano Koch.

He was the father of architect Marcello Piacentini. He died in Rome in 1928.

1846 births
1928 deaths
Artists from Rome
19th-century Italian architects
20th-century Italian architects